"The Mauritius Penny" is the seventh episode of the second series of the 1960s cult British spy-fi television series The Avengers, starring Patrick Macnee and Honor Blackman. It was first broadcast by ABC on 10 November 1962. The episode was directed by Richmond Harding and written by Malcolm Hulke and Terrance Dicks.

Plot
A philatelist is murdered after discovering an extremely rare and valuable stamp on sale. Steed and Cathy investigate and encounter a naughty dentist.

Cast
 Patrick Macnee as John Steed
 Honor Blackman as Cathy Gale  
 Alfred Burke as Brown  
 David Langton as Gerald Shelley
 Richard Vernon as Lord Matterley 
 Sylva Langova as Sheila Gray
 Edward Jewesbury as Maitland 
 Harry Shacklock as Percy Peckham    
 Philip Guard as Peter Goodchild 
 Alan Rolfe as Inspector Burke    
 Grace Arnold as Elsie, Charlady   
 Edward Higgins as P.C. Andrews
 Delia Corrie as Miss Power
 Raymond Hodge as Auction Porter 
 Edwin Brown as Lorry Driver
 Anthony Blackshaw as Lorry Driver's Mate 
 Theodore Wilhelm as Foreign Delegate
 Anthony Rogers as Boy

References

External links

Episode overview on The Avengers Forever! website

The Avengers (season 2) episodes
1962 British television episodes
Philately